Penicillium citrinum is an anamorph, mesophilic fungus species of the genus of Penicillium which produces tanzawaic acid A-D, ACC, Mevastatin, Quinocitrinine A, Quinocitrinine B, and nephrotoxic citrinin. Penicillium citrinum is often found on moldy citrus fruits and occasionally it occurs in tropical spices and cereals. This Penicillium species also causes mortality for the mosquito Culex quinquefasciatus.
Because of its mesophilic character, Penicillium citrinum occurs worldwide. The first statin (Mevastatin) was 1970 isolated from this species.

Further reading
  
  
 
 
 
 
 
  
  
 Fatal Penicillium citrinum Pneumonia with Pericarditis in a Patient with Acute Leukemia

See also
List of Penicillium species

References

citrinum
Fungi described in 1910
Medicinal fungi
Taxa named by Charles Thom